N98 may refer to:
 Boyne City Municipal Airport, in Michigan, United States
 , a submarine of the Royal Navy
 London Buses route N98
 Nebraska Highway 98, in the United States
 Route nationale 98, in France